Yodny Cajuste (born February 21, 1996) is an American football offensive tackle for the New England Patriots of the National Football League (NFL). He played college football at West Virginia.

College career
Cajust played college football for West Virginia. He redshirted during the 2014 season. During the 2015 season he started 6 games before suffering an injury against Baylor. He would return at the end of the season however, as the Mountaineers won the Cactus Bowl. In 2016, he sustained a season ending injury during the first game of the season against Missouri. During 2017, he started 13 games for the Mountaineers and earned All Big 12 Second Team honors. During his final season, 2018, he earned multiple honors including FWAA All-American (Second Team),
Phil Steele All-America (Second Team),
Athlon Sports All-America (Fourth Team),
Big 12 Conference Co-Offensive Lineman of the Year, and
All-Big 12 Conference First Team.

Professional career

Cajuste was drafted by the New England Patriots in the third round (101st overall) of the 2019 NFL Draft. He was placed on the non-football injury list to start the season after undergoing quad surgery.

On September 10, 2020, Cajuste was placed on injured reserve with a knee injury.

Cajuste entered the 2021 as a backup tackle for the Patriots. He made his first career starts in Weeks 5 and 6 at right tackle.

On October 1, 2022, Cajuste was placed on injured reserve with a thumb injury. He was activated on October 29.

References

External links
West Virginia Mountaineers bio

 

1996 births
Living people
Players of American football from Miami
Miramar High School alumni
American football offensive linemen
West Virginia Mountaineers football players
New England Patriots players